Tony Bell (born 20 June 1958) is a freelance writer and journalist, known for his What's he on column in Cycling Weekly, where he was a columnist between 1994 and 2006. His popularity gained as a CW columnist led to engagements as an after-dinner speaker at cycling events.

Bell is also a serious reporter with a degree in politics who has reported on race riots, gangland contracts, drugs wars and environmental and social issues in his native Merseyside for The Independent and The Observer. Following a road accident in which several members of Rhyl cycling club were killed, Bell criticized the attitudes of those such as Jeremy Clarkson, whose column in The Sun he considered anti-cyclist, and what he saw as the cynical attitude of motorists. He called for a single organisation to represent cyclists in the UK to avoid such tragedies recurring.

Bell was also professional cyclist. He once held the mountains and points jerseys in the prestigious Mi-Août Bretonne. He is the brother of former National Amateur and Professional Road Race Champion Mark Bell, who died in 2009.

Bell lives in Chester and supplements his income as a bus driver. He is writing an autobiography, provisionally called "Pinball", excerpts  of which are on his web site.

References

External links
Official website

1958 births
Living people
English male journalists
English male cyclists
Writers from Liverpool
Cycling journalists
People from the Metropolitan Borough of Wirral